This article describes the different ways of forming the plural forms of nouns and adjectives in the Romance languages, and discusses various hypotheses about how these systems emerged historically from the declension patterns of Vulgar Latin.

Three types of plural marking
Romance languages can be divided into two broad groups depending on how the regular plural forms of nouns and adjectives are formed.

One strategy is the addition of the plural suffix -s. For example:
Spanish: buena madre "good mother (sing.)" → buenas madres "good mothers (plur.)"
Modern languages that have this type of plural suffix include Catalan, French, Occitan, Portuguese, Galician, Romansh, Sardinian and  Spanish.

The second strategy involves changing (or adding) the final vowel:
Italian: buona madre "good mother (sing.)" → buone madri "good mothers (plur.)"
The main examples of modern Romance languages exhibiting this type of plural marking are Italian, Venetian, Gallo-Italic languages and Romanian.

The third strategy is present in the Lombard language, especially in the Western Lombard dialect which is the most conservative and archaic variety of the language. While the Eastern variety changed during the Venetian domination by acquiring the vowel plural, in Western Lombard virtually no variation exists between singulars and plurals.

In Western Lombard most of the substantives don't change when they form a plural; the differentiation between the singular and the plural is noticed by the speakers by using the article before the noun. In Lombard the use of the article is a must before every noun in every occasion possible, even before the proper names; excluded only vocative utterances of them. In Western Lombard therefore the differentiation between the singular and the plural form doesn't exist as a suffix but it is individuated by the obligatory use of the article before them. Moreover, despite a clear masculine-feminine distinction in singular nouns, plural forms of related nouns are identical and essentially neuter, lacking any gender distinction whatsoever. Examples:

 (masculine singular) el can (the dog) → ("neuter plural") i can (the dogs);
 (masculine singular) el gat (the cat) → ("neuter plural") i gat (the cats);
 (feminine singular) la ca (the house) → ("neuter plural") i ca (the houses);
 (feminine singular) l`amisa (the female friend) / (masculine singular) l`amis (the male friend) → ("neuter plural") i amis (the friends).

There are very few exceptions in which the plural is formed by suffixes: (masculine singular) l`om (the man) → ("neutral plural") i omen; or another very rare type for words ending in -n in which the plural is created by the substitution of the previous consonant with a double tt: (masculine singular) el muschin (the fly) → (masculine plural) i muschitt (the flies). However, these last typologies are very rare exceptions, most West Lombard plurals are of abovementioned gender-invariable neuter form, recognizable by the use of the plural article.

The historical development of these three distinct types of plural morphology is an important and controversial topic in Romance philology.

Latin

The following table illustrates the singular and plural forms of the 1st, 2nd, and 3rd declensions in Classical Latin.

The corresponding Proto-Romance forms are shown below:

Origin of plural -s

The plural forms in -s in languages like Spanish (for example, buenas madres "good mothers", buenos hombres "good men") can be straightforwardly explained as descendants of Latin accusative forms in -as, -os and -es.

On the other hand, 3rd declension nouns and adjectives have -es in both nominative and accusative, however, so the -s plural for these words could derive from either case form. There is also evidence that Vulgar Latin may have preserved the nominative plural ending -as in the 1st declension, attested in Old Latin and replaced by -ae in literary Classical Latin. The Romance varieties that maintained the distinction between nominative and accusative cases in the medieval period (Old French, Old Occitan, Old Sursilvan) have forms in -s for both nominative and accusative plurals of feminine nouns of the first declension.

Origin of vocalic plurals
There is debate over the origin of the plurals of Italian and Romanian, with some claiming that they derive from the Latin nominative endings -Ī -AE and others that they partly derive from the Latin accusative endings. The "nominative" theory appears more straightforward at first; however, the "accusative" theory is more common currently.

The Italian endings are -i (for nouns in -o, -e and masculine nouns in general), and -e (for feminine nouns in -a); the few remnants of the Latin neuter nouns in  can take -a for the plural. 

The nominative theory suggests that -i as the plural of nouns in -o and -e as the plural of nouns in -a are derived straightforwardly from nominative -Ī and -AE, respectively (it is known that AE > e in all Romance languages), and that the plural -i for nouns in -e is derived by analogy with the plural of nouns in -o. (The corresponding nominative form in Latin is -ĒS.  With the loss of final /s/, singular and plural would both have -e, which is problematic and was rectified by borrowing -i.)

The accusative theory proposes that Italian -e derives from -as. (The change AE > e occurred long before palatalization, hence  is expected here too. It is unlikely that this unusual distribution is due to analogy; if so, either  or  would be expected in both plural forms.) Additionally, Old French feminine plurals end in -es in both the nominative and the oblique (accusative); this may be evidence in favour of a more general Proto-Romance replacement of -AE by -ĀS.

Additionally, the isolated Italian word dunque 'thus' corresponds to Sardinian . Neither word can be derived from Latin DUMQUAM, and the isolated nature of the word means that analogical change is unlikely. Sardinian  suggests Proto-Romance *DUNQUAS, with dunque the expected outcome (even down to the unusual qu preceding e) if -AS > e.

The "accusative" theory essentially suggests:
Italian plurals are indeed derived from the nominative plural.
However, Proto-Romance had the feminine nominative plural -ĀS, not *-AE.
The following sound changes took place:
/as/ > /ai/, /es/ > /ei/, /os/ > /oi/. (If the /s/ was pronounced as [ʃ], [ʂ], [ɕ] or [ç], this may have led to an off-glide [j] after the vowel, as occurs in Portuguese and Catalan.)
In unstressed syllables, /ai/ > /e/, /ei/ > /i/. (However, /oi/ appears to have become /o/.)

The first of these changes is almost certain, given examples like tu stai 'you stand' < TŪ STĀS; Italian crai 'tomorrow' (archaic, literary or regional) < CRĀS; tu sei 'you are' < TŪ *SES; sei 'six' < SEX (probably Proto-Italian *sess). Note also noi 'we' < NŌS, voi 'you (pl.)' < . The second sound change is cross-linguistically extremely common. Furthermore, it explains a number of otherwise unexplainable forms in Italian:
The plural -i corresponding to Latin -ĒS
Verbal tu dormi 'you sleep' < Proto-Western-Romance  < TŪ DORMIS
Verbal tu tieni 'you hold' < TŪ TENĒS
Subjunctive (che) tu ami 'you love' < TŪ AMĒS

Indicative tu ami 'you love' < TŪ AMĀS is unexpected; we would expect *tu ame.  However, tu ame is in fact attested in Old Tuscan. In this case, it appears that -i was generalized as the universal tu ending at the expense of -e. (Note the even more striking generalization of first plural -iamo, originally only the subjunctive form of -ere and -ire verbs.)

See also
Classification of Romance languages
Diachronics of plural inflection in the Gallo-Italian languages
La Spezia–Rimini Line

Notes

References

External links
The Romance noun: A comparative-historical study of plural formation

Romance languages
Grammatical number